Marsha Forchuk Skrypuch (born 1954) is a Ukrainian-Canadian children's writer who currently lives in Brantford, Ontario.

She received a B.A. in English and a Master of Library Science from the University of Western Ontario, and began writing fiction in 1992. Her first book, Silver Threads, was published in 1996.

Marsha Skrypuch is the author of many books for children and young adults. She primarily writes about war from a young person's perspective. She is also the author of the Making Bombs for Hitler trilogy which consists of Making Bombs for Hitler, The War Below, and Stolen Girl.

Works 

Silver Threads – 1996
The Best Gifts – 1998
The Hunger – 1999
Enough – 2000
Hope's War – 2001
Nobody's Child – 2003
Aram's Choice – 2006
Kobzar's Children: A Century of Untold Ukrainian Stories – 2006
Dear Canada: Prisoners in the Promised Land: The Ukrainian Internment Diary of Anya Soloniuk, Spirit Lake, Quebec, 1914 – 2007
Daughter of War – 2008
Call Me Aram – 2009
A Christmas To Remember – 2009 -- "An Unexpected Visitor" was written by Skrypuch for this anthology.
Stolen Girl (originally Stolen Child) – 2010
Last Airlift: A Vietnamese Orphan's Rescue from War – 2011
Making Bombs For Hitler – 2012 
One Step At A Time: A Vietnamese Child Finds Her Way – 2012
When Mama Goes to Work – 2013
Underground Soldier – 2014 
Dance of the Banished – 2014
Adrift at Sea: A Vietnamese Boy's Story of Survival – 2016
Don't Tell the Nazis (originally Don't Tell the Enemy) – 2018
The War Below (originally Underground Soldier) - 2018
Trapped in Hitler's Web - 2020
Sky of Bombs, Sky of Stars; A Vietnamese War Orphan Finds Home - 2020 (omnibus edition of Last Airlift and One Step at a Time)
Traitors Among Us - 2021
Winterkill - 2022

Awards 
 1996, Taras Shevchenko for Silver Threads
 2000, CCBC's Our Choice Award for The Hunger
 2001, CCBC's Our Choice Award for Enough
 2002, CCBC's Our Choice Award for Hope's War
 2004 CCBC's Our Choice Award for Nobody's Child
 2006 CCBC's Our Choice for Aram's Choice
 2008 Order of Princess Olga, for her writing on the Holodomor, in particular her book Enough
 2010 Woman of Distinction, World Congress of Ukrainian Women's Organizations
 2010 Calliope Award for outstanding writing and mentoring, Humber School for Writers
 2011 SCBWI Crystal Kite Award for the Americas, for Stolen Child
 2012 CCBC Best Books for Kids: Last Airlift
 2012 CCBC Best Books For Kids: Stolen Child
 2012 CCBC Best Books For Kids, Starred Review: Making Bombs For Hitler
 2012 CCBC Best Books for Kids: Making Bombs For Hitler
 2013 Red Cedar Book Award Winner in category "Information", Last Airlift
 2013 Silver Birch Fiction Winner: Making Bombs For Hitler
 2014 Manitoba Young Readers' Choice Award: Making Bombs For Hitler
 2014 Silver Birch non-fiction Winner: One Step At A Time: A Vietnamese Child Finds Her Way
 2014 Underground Soldier: Starred Selection, CCBC Best Books for Kids
 2015 Underground Soldier: Geoffrey Bilson Award nominee
 2015 Dance of the Banished: Geoffrey Bilson Award WINNER
 2015 Dance of the Banished: Junior Library Guild selection April
 2015 Dance of the Banished: CCBC Best Books for Kids
 2015 Dance of the Banished: The White Ravens selection 2015
 2016 Dance of the Banished: USBBY Outstanding International Book
 2016 Underground Soldier: Kobzar Literary Award nominee
 2016 Adrift At Sea: Resource Links Best Book
 2017 Adrift At Sea: Starred selection: ABC CLIO
 2017 Adrift At Sea: Starred selection: CCBC Best Books for Kids
 2017 The Best Gifts: Storytelling World Resource Honor Book
 2017 Adrift At Sea: 2017 Canadian Children’s Literature Roundtables Information Book Award, Honour Book
 2017 Adrift At Sea: Cybils Finalist for MG non-fiction.
 2018 Adrift At Sea: Golden Oak Award shortlist,
 2018–19 Adrift At Sea: Louisiana Young Readers’ Choice nominee,
 2018 Adrift At Sea: Selected for Pope Francis exhibit, Bologna Italy,

References

External links 
 
 Writers' Union of Canada
 Marsha Skrypuch at the Canadian Society of Children's Authors, Illustrators, and Performers (CANSCAIP.org)
 IBBY Canada interview with Marsha Skrypuch
 Open Book Toronto interview On Writing
 

1954 births
Living people
Canadian children's writers
Ukrainian-Canadian culture in Ontario